Fibroblast activation protein alpha (FAP-alpha) also known as prolyl endopeptidase FAP is an enzyme that in humans is encoded by the FAP gene.

Prolyl endopeptidase FAP is a 170 kDa membrane-bound gelatinase. It was independently identified as a surface glycoprotein recognized by the F19 monoclonal antibody in activated fibroblasts and a Surface Expressed Protease (seprase) in invasive melanoma cells.

Structure and enzymatic activity  

FAP is a 760 amino acid long type II transmembrane glycoprotein. It contains a very short cytoplasmic N terminal part (6 amino acids), a transmembrane region (amino acids 7–26), and a large extracellular part with an alpha/beta-hydrolase domain and an eight-bladed beta-propeller domain.

A soluble form of FAP, which lacks the intracellular and transmembrane part, is present in blood plasma. FAP is a non-classical serine protease, which belongs to the S9B prolyl oligopeptidase subfamily. Other members of the S9B subfamily are DPPIV, DPP8 and DPP9. FAP is most closely related to DPPIV (approximately 50% of their amino acids are identical). The active site of FAP is localized in the extracellular part of the protein and contains a catalytic triad composed of Ser624 Asp702 His734 in humans and mice. FAP is catalytically active as a 170kD homodimer and has a dipeptidase and an endopeptidase activity.

Several bioactive peptides and structural proteins were reported to be cleaved by FAP, such as neuropeptide Y (NPY), Peptide YY, Substance P (SP), and B-type natriuretic peptide (BNP), human fibroblast growth factor 21 (FGF-21), human alpha2 antiplasmin and denatured collagen I and III. NPY, FGF-21 and alpha2 antiplasmin are considered to be physiological FAP substrates.

Expression and possible function 

FAP expression under physiological conditions is very low in the majority of adult tissues. FAP is nevertheless expressed during embryonic development, and in adults in pancreatic alpha cells in multipotent bone marrow stromal cells (BM-MSC) and uterine stroma.

FAP expression is high in reactive stromal fibroblasts of epithelial cancers, granulation tissue of healing wounds, and malignant cells of bone and soft tissue sarcomas. FAP is thought to be involved in the control of fibroblast growth or epithelial-mesenchymal interactions during development, tissue repair, and epithelial carcinogenesis.

Clinical significance 

FAP expression is seen on activated stromal fibroblasts of more than 90% of all human carcinomas. Stromal fibroblasts play an important role in the development, growth and metastasis of carcinomas. Several approaches of FAP targeting mainly in cancer treatment are currently being tested including the use of low molecular weight inhibitors, prodrugs activated by FAP, various anti-FAP antibodies and their conjugates, FAP-CAR T cells, and FAP vaccines.

By cleaving FGF-21, FAP is also thought to play a possible role in energy metabolism.

Talabostat is an inhibitor of FAP and related enzymes, for which clinical trials have been done, but further research is suspended.

Sibrotuzumab is a monoclonal antibody against FAP.

References

Further reading

External links 
 

EC 3.4.21